Denis Roabeș, better known as The Motans, is a Moldovan singer, songwriter and lyricist.

Life and career

1989–2014
Denis Roabeș was born on August 2, 1989, in the Republic of Moldova. After graduating from high school, he worked as a marketing and sales specialist and lived and worked for three years in Moscow. In 2014, he returned home to the Republic of Moldova because he understood that marketing is not what he wanted to do in life.

The stage name has its origins in the artist's dreams. Before starting his music career, Denis only dreamed of tomcats and cats every night for seven years. When he began singing, these dreams disappeared, and for this reason, he chose the name The Motans.

2015–2018
After releasing the song "Versus" in August 2016, The Motans came to the attention of Romanian vlogger Matei Dima. He contacted the artist and helped him launch and promote himself in Romania.

The Motans returned with a new single in early 2017. The song "Weekend" was made in collaboration with Delia.

On September 1, 2018, The Motans gave a recital at the Gala of the Golden Stag Festival in Brasov.

2019–2021
In 2019, The Motans won three awards at The Artist Awards: YouTube Awards, Best Song ("Poem" with Irina Rimes) and Best Collaboration ("Poem" with Irina Rimes).

The Motans’ second album was My Rhythm & Soul. The 12-track album was released on August 13, 2020, by Global and includes the collaboration with Irina Rimes on the hit "Poem" and "Saint Loneliness", an atypical featuring with the Black Sea. All songs were composed by The Motans and produced by Alex Cotoi, Viky Red, Marcel Botezan & Sebastian Barac, Vlad Lucan, Vladimir Coman and Achi Petre.

In October 2020, The Motans and Emaa released the song "Insula".

In 2021 The Motans won the award for Best Live Act at The Artist Awards, an annual music event held in Romania, organized by Big Events in partnership with the Romanian Opera Craiova.

2022 
In June 2022, he was announced as one of the four coaches of season 10 of Vocea României.

Discography

Singles 
2017
 "Weekend" (with Delia)
 "Fifty-Fifty"
 "1000 RPM"
 "Versus"
 "August"
 "Nota de plată" (with Inna)
 "Friend Zone"
 "Lilith" (with Keed)
2018
 "Drama Queen"
 "Jackpot"
 "Mr. Tort"
 "Pentru Că" (with Inna)
 "Subtitre" (Alt DJ featuring The Motans)
 "Cel mai bun DJ" (with Irina Rimes)
 "Înainte să ne fi născut"
 "Maraton"
 "Saint Loneliness" (with Marea Neagră)
2019
 "Poem" (with Irina Rimes)
 "Valuri Mari"
 "Bine Indispus"
2020
 "Din trecut" (with Alina Eremia)
 "Ani lumină"
 "Cel Din Oglinda"
 "Astrologic Vorbind"
 "Insula" (with Emaa)
 "Sigur"
2021
 "Povestea unui naufragiat"
 "Vara în care m-ai găsit" (with PAX)
 "Copiii care au visat greșit"
 "A mea"
 "La Nesfârșit"
2022
 "Tare" (with Inna)

Albums

References

External links 

 TheMotans.com - Official website
 

Global Records artists
Romanian music
Living people
1989 births
21st-century Romanian male singers
21st-century Romanian singers